The Faculty of Human, Social, and Political Science at the University of Cambridge was created in 2011 out of a merger of the Faculty of Archaeology and Anthropology and the Faculty of Politics, Psychology, Sociology and International Studies. According to the Cambridge HSPS website: graduates pursue careers in "research (both academic and policy research), the Civil Service (including the Foreign Office), journalism, management consultancy, museums, conservation and heritage management, national and international NGOs and development agencies, the Law, teaching, publishing, health management, and public relations."

The Faculty houses four departments: the Department of Archaeology, the Department of Social Anthropology, the Department of Politics and International Studies and the Department of Sociology. Each of these departments has a worldwide reputation for teaching and research, and the undergraduate curriculum (Tripos) is designed to serve not only students who have clear disciplinary commitments at the time of application but also those who want broader multidisciplinary degrees. Students with a passion for politics can take advantage of links with such departments as Economics and History, those with interests in Sociology can draw on Anthropology and Geography, while those dedicated to pursuing an archaeology career can specialise from the first year or combine Archaeology with Biological and Social Anthropology.

Undergraduate students study several disciplines in their first year and then specialise in one or two disciplines in their second and third years. Clearly specified tracks (Archaeology, Biological Anthropology, Politics, Psychology, Social Anthropology, Sociology, or a combination of disciplines) ensure that students graduate with appropriate intellectual and professional skills. Assyriology and Egyptology are also possible specialisations within the Archaeology track.

At the postgraduate level there are established one-year MPhils in Archaeology (including Assyriology and Egyptology), Biological Anthropology, International Studies, Social Anthropology, and Sociology. The sociology MPhil allows for specialisation in one of four areas: reproduction; political economy; marginality and exclusion; and media and culture. A new MPhil in Politics was launched in 2008.

For further postgraduate study PhD students conduct research within a wide range of subjects within Archaeology, Assyriology, Egyptology, Biological and Social Anthropology, Politics and International Studies, and Sociology.

The Faculty is currently spread across several sites. The SPS Library (now affiliated with the University Library) and the Department of Sociology are on Free School Lane at the New Museums Site. The Department of Politics and International Studies is in the Alison Richard Building on the Sidgwick Site. The Department of Archaeology and Anthropology is spread across the Downing Site, the New Museums Site and the Henry Wellcome Building.

Selected members of the Faculty

University and College Teaching Officers in the HSPS Faculty
 Graeme Barker, Professor of Archaeology
 Henrietta Moore, William Wyse Professor of Social Anthropology
 John Thompson, sociology
 Patrick Baert, sociology
 Andrew Gamble, government, politics & political economy 
 Christopher Hill, international studies
 Juliet Mitchell, gender studies
 David Runciman, politics
 Glen Rangwala, specialising in Middle East politics
 John Dunn, political theory
 Göran Therborn, social theory
 Sylvana Tomaseli, history
 Ruth Scurr, history

Members of the Faculty elsewhere in the University
 Colin Renfrew, McDonald Institute for Archaeological Research
 Gareth Stedman Jones, History (Political Thought)
 Alan Macfarlane, Anthropology
 Quentin Skinner, Christ's College (History of Political Thought)
 William Brown, Economics 
 Marilyn Strathern, Anthropology
 Lord Runciman, Trinity College
 Simon Baron-Cohen, Experimental Psychology
 Sandra Dawson, Management Studies (currently Chair of the Faculty Board)

Teaching
Tripos (BA)

An Archaeology and Anthropology Tripos has been taught at Cambridge for more than one hundred years. A Politics, Psychology and Sociology Tripos (previously known as Social and Political Sciences, "SPS") has been running at Cambridge University, in some form, since 1970. In 2013 the PPS and A&A Triposes were replaced by the Human, Social, and Political Sciences Tripos (HSPS), which offers students opportunities to explore a wide range of multidisciplinary options before specialising in one or two subjects, or to specialise from the first year, according to their interests.

Postgraduate (MPhil/PhD)

The Faculty teaches seven master's programmes in  Politics, International Studies, Sociology, Social Anthropology, Social and Developmental Psychology, Archaeology (including Assyriology and Egyptology), and Biological Anthropology. The Faculty also has around 200 students studying for doctorates at any one time. According to the Cambridge HSPS website, graduates pursue careers in "research (both academic and policy research), the Civil Service (including the Foreign Office), journalism, management consultancy, museums, conservation and heritage management, national and international NGOs and development agencies, the Law, teaching, publishing, health management, and public relations".

Applications
The number of applicants per place for Politics, Psychology and Sociology has traditionally been one of the highest in Cambridge. On average there are six applications per offered place, though this ratio is better at some colleges such as Murray Edwards. Colleges with particular teaching strength in Human, Social, and Political Science include Selwyn, Gonville and Caius, Queens', King's, Sidney Sussex, Corpus Christi and Trinity. Numbers of applications for the new HSPS BA course remain high across all colleges. Typical offers for the course are A*AA at A Level, or 40–42 points out of 45 with 776 or 777 at Higher Level in the International Baccalaureate.

As of 2008–2009 the MPhil in Social and Developmental Psychology received 66 applications, with 7 starting the course in October 2008. The MPhil in Modern Society and Global Transformations saw 99 applicants, with 26 starting the course in October 2008.

Notable alumni
 Patrick Barkham, journalist
 Kari Blackburn, BBC producer
 Jimmy Carr, comedian
Jo Cox, former Labour MP for Batley and Spen (deceased)
 Dr Stella Creasy, Labour MP for Walthamstow
Natalie Evans, Leader of the House of Lords
Johann Hari, journalist
Naomie Harris, Academy Award-nominated actress
 Jim Knight, Labour MP and Minister for Schools and Learners
John Healey, Labour MP and Minister for Communities and Local Government
Richard Lander, director of Citywire"
Hugh Laurie, actor
Gautam Malkani, novelist and Financial Times'' journalist
 Chris Naylor, CEO of London Borough of Barking and Dagenham
Richard Osman, television presenter, producer and director
Helen Oyeyemi, novelist and playwright
 Maddy Savage – BBC TV and radio reporter
Ben Schott, writer and photographer
Galen Strawson, analytic philosopher and literary critic
Christopher Steele, former British Intelligence officer and author of the Steele Dossier
Tilda Swinton, Oscar-winning actress

References

 
Human, Social, and Political Science, Faculty of
Cambridge, University of
Cambridge, University of